The 1983 Supertaça Cândido de Oliveira was the 5th edition of the Supertaça Cândido de Oliveira, the annual Portuguese football season-opening match contested by the winners of the previous season's top league and cup competitions (or cup runner-up in case the league- and cup-winning club is the same). The 1983 Supertaça Cândido de Oliveira was contested over two legs, and opposed Benfica and Porto of the Primeira Liga. Benfica qualified for the SuperCup by winning both the 1982–83 Primeira Divisão and the 1982–83 Taça de Portugal, whilst Porto qualified for the Supertaça as the cup runner-up.

The first leg which took place at the Estádio das Antas, saw a goalless draw. The second leg which took place at the Estádio da Luz saw Porto defeat Benfica 2–1 (2–1 on aggregate), which granted the Dragões a second Supertaça.

First leg

Details

Second leg

Details

References

Supertaça Cândido de Oliveira
Super
FC Porto matches
S.L. Benfica matches